This is a list of the number-one downloaded songs in Canada during the year 2022.

The Nielsen SoundScan-compiled chart is published on Music Canada's website on Mondays and Billboard on Tuesdays.

Chart history

See also
 List of Canadian Hot 100 number-one singles of 2022
 List of number-one albums of 2022 (Canada)

References

External links
 Billboard Canadian Digital Song Sales
 Current Hot Digital Canadian Songs

Canada Digital Songs
Digital 2022
2022 in Canadian music